Alexander Forbes "Alan" Young (born 26 October 1955) is a Scottish footballer who played as a forward in the Football League.

He was born in Kirkcaldy. Having played for three clubs in the English East Midlands, Young still lives on the outskirts of Nottingham, in West Bridgford, and was a regular summariser during live football commentary on BBC Radio Leicester.

References

External links

1955 births
Living people
Scottish footballers
Footballers from Kirkcaldy
Association football forwards
Oldham Athletic A.F.C. players
Leicester City F.C. players
Sheffield United F.C. players
Brighton & Hove Albion F.C. players
Notts County F.C. players
Rochdale A.F.C. players
Shepshed Dynamo F.C. players
English Football League players
Outfield association footballers who played in goal